Audrey Linkenheld, born 11 October 1973 in Strasbourg, is a French politician.  She was the deputy for Nord's 2nd constituency from 2012 to 2017.

Linkenheld began her political engagement as the national secretary of the Young Socialist Movement.  From 2008, she was deputy mayor of Lille, in charge of housing.

She successfully stood in the 2012 French legislative election for Nord's 2nd constituency against another deputy mayor of Lille, Éric Quiquet.

After the victory of Benoît Hamon in the citizen's primary of 2017, she was named the leader (with Daniel Goldberg) of the "Politics of the city, housing" theme of Hamon's presidential campaign.
In her National Assembly re-election attempt in 2017, she was eliminated (by a small margin) in the first round.

She is on the board of Sciences Po Lille.

External links
 Her page on the site of the National Assembly

References

1973 births
Living people
Women members of the National Assembly (France)
Deputies of the 14th National Assembly of the French Fifth Republic
Politicians from Strasbourg
Politicians from Lille
21st-century French women politicians
Socialist Party (France) politicians